Punjabi dances are an array of folk and religious dances of the Punjabi people indigenous to the Punjab region, straddling the border of India and Pakistan. The style of Punjabi dances ranges from very high energy to slow and reserved, and there are specific styles for men and women. Some of the dances are secular while others are presented in religious contexts.

Overview
The main Punjabi folk dance for females is Gidda and for men Bhangra.
The dances are typically performed at times of celebration, such as harvest (Visakhi), weddings, Lohri, etc.. Married Punjabi couples usually dance together.

Common Punjabi female folk dances
 Sammi
 Giddha
 Kikli
Common Punjabi male folk dances
 Bhangra
 Malwai Giddha
 Jhumar
 Luddi
 Gatka
 Julli

References

External links

 Glossary of different Punjabi Folk Dances
 Folk dances of Punjab
 Activities in Lahore and Folk Dances
 Folk Dances in Punjab

Punjab
 
Punjabi culture
Dances of Pakistan
India dance-related lists